The Lyceum Club of Greek Women is a woman's club founded in Athens, Greece in 1911 by feminist Kalliroi Parren. The Lyceum Club of Greek Women is the first organized women’s association in Greece and is still active. The  Lyceum Club of Greek Women has 51 branches including 16 outside of Greece. Its purpose is to preserve and promote Greek cultural heritage.

In 1988 the club was able to present their collection of Greek national costumes in its permanent home, the Museum of the History of the Greek Costume of the Lyceum Club of Greek Women.

References

Women's clubs
1911 establishments in Greece
Organizations based in Athens
Women's organizations based in Greece